Bulimulus jacobi is a species of  tropical air-breathing land snail, a pulmonate gastropod mollusk in the subfamily Bulimulinae.

This species is endemic to Ecuador. Its natural habitats are subtropical or tropical dry shrubland and subtropical or tropical dry lowland grassland. It is threatened by habitat loss.

References

Bulimulus
Gastropods described in 1833
Taxa named by George Brettingham Sowerby I
Taxonomy articles created by Polbot